Zeiraphera rufimitrana, the red-headed fir tortricid, is a moth of the family Tortricidae. It is found from central Europe to eastern Russia, Mongolia, the Korean Peninsula, China (Jilin, Heilongjiang) and Japan. It was first recorded from the Netherlands by Kuchlein and Naves in 1999.

The wingspan is 12–16 mm. Adults are on wing from the end of June to August.

The larvae of ssp. truncata feed on Abies sachalinensis. Larvae of the nominate subspecies feed on Abies alba, Abies cephalonica, Abies balsamea, Pinus pinea and Picea excelsa. The larvae feed in buds and on new needles. The infested crowns may stain reddish.

Subspecies
Zeiraphera rufimitrana rufimitrana
Zeiraphera rufimitrana truncata Oku, 1968 (Japan)

References

External links
Eurasian Tortricidae

Eucosmini
Moths described in 1851
Insects of Korea
Moths of Japan
Moths of Europe